James Barr (1779–1860) was a Scottish composer who composed the tune which inspired the tune now used for the Australian traditional song "Waltzing Matilda."

Born in Tarbolton in South Ayrshire, Barr taught music and worked for a publisher in Glasgow. Barr set several poems by his friend Robert Tannahill to music.

According to Christina Macpherson, "Waltzing Matilda" was created in the sitting room of Dagworth Station in January 1895 with the help of a young solicitor and poet, "Banjo" Paterson. Tannahill wrote the words in 1805 and in 1818 Barr set them to music, possibly based on the melody of "Go to the Devil and Shake Yourself."

Barr emigrated for Canada in 1832, where he worked as a farmer until 1855. He died in Kilbarchan in Renfrewshire, Scotland.

References

1779 births
1860 deaths
Scottish composers